Ruby the Galactic Gumshoe is a science fiction radio drama series by the ZBS Foundation, written by Thomas Lopez. The first series, Ruby: Adventures of A Galactic Gumshoe, was created in 1982.  In each story, the title character Ruby is hired to solve a metaphysical problem. New series have been released every few years, reaching Ruby 10 in 2018. Ruby is played by actress Laura Esterman.

Description
Ruby is a comic science fiction treatment of the hardboiled detective genre; the original series took place on the planet of Summa Nulla ("the high point of nothing") although later series took Ruby to other planets and solar systems.

Laura Esterman starred as Ruby in the first series and Karen Young starred in the second series as "Ruby Too", another version of the protagonist, while Esterman, as Ruby, had a cameo part in this series. Esterman returned to the lead role from Ruby 3 onwards, credited as Blanche Blackwell.

The series was originally syndicated to air on the radio in episodes of approximately three to four minutes long, but later released as half-hour episodes to radio stations.  To date, thirteen Ruby adventures have been released, the most recent in 2019.

Ruby has been broadcast in 23 countries, including Canada (on CBC), England (on BBC), Australia (on ABC) and the US (originally on PBS, more recently on Sirius-XM Satellite Radio).  Ruby entered Science Fiction's Audio Hall of Fame for Best Science Fiction of 1982.

Series

Ruby: The Adventures of a Galactic Gumshoe (1982)
This story was the very first cyberpunk radio drama. In it, Ruby is hired by Rodant Kapoor to find out who is manipulating the media on Summa Nulla. 
 Ruby: Laura Esterman
 T.J. Teru: Bill Raymond
 Angel Lips: Robin Karfo
 And/Or, Rodant Kapoor, and Mother Kapoor: Tom Stewart
 The Android Sisters: Ruth Breuer & Valeria Vasilevski
 Chief , the Tookah: Fred Neuman
 Onoffon and Moleena Mole: Honora Ferguson
 Offonoff: Valeria Vasilevski
 Monet: Count Stovall
 Moonbeam: Elaine Graham
 Toots Mutant: Cara Duff-McCormick
 Harold Matisse: Chris McCaan
 The Vocoder Chorus: Tim Clark
 The Announcer: Dave Herman
 Executive Producer & Director: Thomas Manuel Lopez
 Author: Meatball Fulton
 Music: Original score for Ruby, composed and performed by Tim Clark

Ruby 2: The Further Adventures of a Galactic Gumshoe (1985)
Ruby Two is hired to find out who's "windowing" the Bulldada.
 Ruby 2: Karen Young
 Ruby: Laura Esterman
 Rodant Kapoor, And/Or & Mother Kapoor: Tom Stewart
 T.J. Teru: Bill Raymond
 The Tookah, the Booger Man & Dr. Frank-n-furter: Fred Neuman
 Sam the Bardroid, Pisaro & Count Velcro: Peter Freedman
 "Big Money": Phoenix
 Sal the Robot: Eve Benton-Gordon
 The Bulldada, the Native Robot Guide & the Minotaur: Walter Cotton
 Mother Koan: Ellen MacLeDuff
 Julio "Hot Stuff" Sanchez: Gregorio Rosenblum
 Horace Wimpy: David Brisbane
 Ozymandias: John Wynn-Evans
 The Digital Dentist: Skip Pink
 Betty & Teddy: Phoenix & Tom Stewart
 The Chorus of Tykes: Jacob Fructer
 The Announcer: Dave Herman with assistance from Tom Stewart
 Executive Producer & Director: Thomas Lopez
 Written by Meatball Fulton (in deep collaboration with Phoenix)
 Music: Tim Clark

Ruby 3: The Underworld / The Invisible World (1990–1991)
Part One: The Underworld:
Ruby is hired by the Aurorian Man Ray to trace a dark force entering Summa Nulla through the walls of Magnifico – City of Malls.  Meanwhile, "techno-anthropologist" Inanna undertakes a quest to the dark and hellish Underworld to discover the meaning behind the mysterious "Seven Gates".

Part Two: The Invisible World:
Ruby, Inanna and Kapoor find themselves stranded in the Invisible World, where each of them is forced to confront the dark force in their own way.

 Ruby: Blanche Blackwell (Laura Esterman)
 T.J. Teru: Bill Raymond
 Inanna: Jona Harris
 Manray & Mustapha: Willy B
 Rodant Kapoor, And/Or & Mother Kapoor: Art Fairbain (Tom Stewart)
 Father Mojo: Dave Adams
 Sister Hoolooopoo: Gretel
 Junior Kapoor: Nebadon Adams
 Imogene Kapoor: Dalia Schneier
 Maharini: Valeria Vasilevski
 The Inky: Felix Avocado
 Mister Concertina: Andre Adler
 Molet the Mole & Tookah 2: Gregorio Rosenblum
 The Android Sisters: Ruth Maleczech (previously credited as Ruth Breuer) & Valeria Vasilevski
 The Big Scuzz: Greg Merton
 Toadface: Terry O'Reilly
 Clay People and Punishing Stones: Terry O'Reilly, Greg Merton & Felix Avocado
 Zumzammim: Remly Hodgekiss
 Ringmaster: John McDonough
 Bartender: Ruth Maleczech
 Roger Robot: Hoopy Lewis
 Dr. Lazer: Leslie Blanford
 Monet: Karras Berlin
 Narrator: Kirby Airs
 Executive Producer & Director: Thomas Manuel Lopez
 Story by Thomas Lopez & Marcia Dale Lopez
 Script by Meatball Fulton
 Music Composed and Performed by Tim Clark

Ruby 4: The Moon Coins of Sonto Lore (1994–1995)
Part One: The Moon Coins of Sonto Lore 
Ruby is hired by Marimba Mambo to find the four Moon Coins of Sonto Lore - the mythical fourth moon of Summa Nulla.  The investigation accidentally uncovers a planned invasion by extra-dimensional Reptoids.

Part Two: The Turban of El Morya
And/Or attempts to build an invisible "light machine" on the orders of Nikola Tesla (who may have a hidden agenda of his own), while Teru is held prisoner on the Reptoid planet.

Part Three: Dark Night of the Reptoids
Ruby returns to the Reptoid planet in an attempt to rescue Teru.

Part Four: Mad Moon for Rubina
Summa Nulla is pulled into the fifth dimension... with cataclysmic consequences!

 Ruby: Blanche Blackwell (Laura Esterman)
 T.J. Teru: Bill Raymond
 Rodant Kapoor, And/Or & Mother Kapoor: Art Fairbain (Tom Stewart)
 Nikola Tesla, François the Robot, Zandero, E. Gad (Man in Café): Jim Cantell
 Rubina: Katja Frazier
 Toots Mutant: Ruth Maleczech
 Marimba Mambo: Gregorio Rosenblum
 Reppies: Rob Harari
 Mino Loonga: Leslie Blandford
 The Creeper: Felix Avocado
 Father Mojo: Dave Adams
 Producer/Director: Tom Lopez
 Story: Tom & Marcia Dale Lopez (Part 1), Meatball Fulton (Parts 2–4)
 Script: Meatball Fulton
 Music: Tim Clark

Ruby 5: The Land of Zoots (1998)
Ruby is hired by President Koonstar Bootstah to find out who created the Land of Zoots, a fantasy land that has stated to be made real by the inhabitants of the Awakening Archipelago.
 Ruby: Blanche Blackwell (Laura Esterman)
 T.J. Teru: Hamilton Dobbs (Bill Raymond)
 Toots Mutant: Ruth Maleczech
 Rodant Kapoor, And/Or, Mother Kapoor, Mr. Bubble & Big Teddy: Art Fairbain (Tom Stewart)
 François, Freddie Foo Foo, Prof Magnolia Warbler, Little Teddy, Palsy Walsy Panda, Prof Toto LeToe: Jim Cantell
 Angel Eyes, Coonstar Boostah, Barbie Bazooms: Rene Augesen
 Mr. Mollusk, The Wizard of Zoots: Bill Hufnagle
 The Android Sisters: Ruth Maleczech & Valeria Vasilevski
 The Balluka: Ida Faiella
 Narrator: Kirby Airs
 Director: Tom Lopez
 Script: Meatball Fulton
 Music: Tim Clark

Ruby 6: The Illusionati (2001)
Ruby is hired by Oop Boop, an Illuboo from the planet Illuboo Roi, to uncover members of the Illuboo secret society, the Illusionati.
 Ruby: Blanche Blackwell (Laura Esterman)
 T.J. Teru: Bill Raymond
 Rodant Kapoor, And/Or & Mother Kapoor: Art Fairbain (Tom Stewart)
 Angel Babe & Lady Bassoon: Shelley Williams
 Boom-Boom Bassoon: Bill Westonberg
 Sue Foo: Leslie Blandford
 Cream Puff & Yummy Yaszoom: Nathan Robbins
 Ambassador Woogie & Ringmaster: Neu Fredmann
 Narrator: Kirby Airs
 Producer/Director: Tom Lopez
 Writer: Meatball Fulton
 Music: Tim Clark

Ruby 6.5: Far Flung Farouk (2004)
Ruby, Teru, Kapoor, and And/Or are hired to investigate the royal tomb of Far Flung Farouk.
 Ruby: Blanche Blackwell (Laura Esterman)
 T.J. Teru: Bill Raymond
 Rodant Kapoor, And/Or & Wop Wop Bop: Art Fairbain (Tom Stewart)
 Captain Laconic & Prince Haw Hee Bop: Bill Blechingberg
 Producer/Director: Tom Lopez
 Writer: Meatball Fulton
 Music: Tim Clark

Ruby 7: Dream Weaver, Dream Deceiver (2006)
The Morpheusians are experiencing fear for the first time in their lives, and Ruby is hired to find out who, how and why.
 Ruby: Blanche Blackwell (Laura Esterman)
 T.J. Teru: Bill Raymond
 Rodant Kapoor, And/Or & Mother Kapoor: Art Fairbain (Tom Stewart)
 Angel Cheeks: Cheyenne Casebier
  & the Tookah: Neu Fredmann
 Moo, Ringmaster, Talking Loo, Alien & Clown: Nathan Robbins
 The Android Sisters: Ruth Maleczech & Valeria Vasilevski
 Producer/Director: Tom Lopez
 Script: Meatball Fulton
 Music: Tim Clark

Ruby 7.5: The Tookah's Tales (2008)
Ruby entices the Tookah to tell his strange tales of what it is like to live on other planets.
 Ruby: Blanche Blackwell (Laura Esterman)
 The Tookah: John McDonough
 Producer/Director: Tom Lopez
 Story and Script: Meatball Fulton
 Music: Tim Clark

Ruby 8: The Good King Kapoor (2009)
Ruby is hired by Mother Kapoor to bring home her son Rodant, who is hiding out in another universe.
 Ruby: Blanche Blackwell (Laura Esterman)
 T.J. Teru: Bill Raymond
 Rodant Kapoor, And/Or & Mother Kapoor: Art Fairbain (Tom Stewart)
 Onoffon: Ruth Maleczech
 Offonoff & Woman: Leslie Geraci
 Wazir & Reptoids: Tom Robbins
 The Narrator: Dave Herman
 Producer/Director: Tom Lopez
 Story & Script: Meatball Fulton
 Music: Tim Clark

Ruby 9: Masque of the Red Moon (2012)
Two preview chapters of Ruby 9 were posted on the ZBS website in July 2012. The two chapters, "The City of Lost Illusions" and "The Hoochie Coochie Club" feature the series' main cast (Laura Esterman as Ruby, Bill Raymond as T.J. Teru and Tom Stewart as And/Or and Rodant Kapoor). The story involves the four characters going undercover on a steampunk-inspired planet.

 Ruby: Blanche Blackwell (Laura Esterman)
 T.J. Teru: Bill Raymond
 Rodant Kapoor, And/Or & Mother Kapoor: Tom Stewart
 Producer/Director: Tom Lopez
 Story & Script: Meatball Fulton
 Music: Tim Clark

Ruby 9.5: Who Knows How This Ends? (2015)
Deep in the jungles of the Great Zeezeeboos, on the planet of Summa Nulla, is the spiral city of Oroboros, once known as The City of the Future". But the future has passed, Oroboros has been abandoned, or so everyone believed.
 Ruby: Blanche Blackwell (Laura Esterman)
 T.J. Teru: Bill Raymond
 Rodant Kapoor, And/Or & Mother Kapoor: Tom Stewart
 Producer/Director: Tom Lopez
 Story & Script: Meatball Fulton
 Music: Tim Clark

Ruby 10: The Black Star of Summa Nulla (2018)
Kapoor sets himself up as a detective, and is hired to locate the Black Star of Summa Nulla – a magical stone that can tell the future. Once Kapoor's found the stone and disappeared with it, Ruby's hired to track him down.

Pilots
"Tired of the Green Menace"
The pilot for the Ruby series. Ruby Tuesday is hired by Colonel Abulah Abdullah to find out who has stolen Cleo, a small planet from Saudi Asteroidia in the Middle Eastern star cluster. Her only lead is the Advanced Fulcrum Magnetic Works of Fong on the planet of Dong-A-Long, who while previously unknown have recently appeared with highly sophisticated technology to move large asteroids around for easy mining. 
"Rebel from Utopia"
Ruby Star is hired by Kapoor to locate "Mr. X", an earthling.

Spinoff

Ol' Cactus Kapoor (2006)
In 2006, ZBS released a collection of nine stories about Rodant Kapoor, Ol’ Cactus Kapoor and Other Prickly Tales. The collection included "Ol' Cactus Kapoor", "The Colossal Kapoor", "The Seven Sacred Sapphires of Kapoor", "Judge Rodant and The Rest of The Rats", "Extract of Little Fooie", "The Purple Purse", "The 12 Famous Land Sharks School", "Trader Kapoor and The Woolie Boolies", and "How Real Is Real Anyway?"

Major characters
Ruby, a galactic gumshoe hired in each series to investigate a usually existential mystery. She has the ability to slow time and her favorite weapon is the powerful and extremely noisy Smith-Hitachi Godzilla Blaster (later replaced by the Smith-Hitachi Godzilla Blunderbuss Blaster). (Played by Laura Esterman, credited as "Blanche Blackwell" from Ruby 3 on)
T. J. Teru, a human archaeologist whose life work is uncovering artifacts left by the ancient Nullian people who once inhabited the planet where the series takes place. Often helps Ruby with his investigations; has a fetish for plastic, especially when it is part of female androids. He was bedeviled by the And/Or Sisters in their guises of "Dr. Lazar" and "Dr. Duck" in Ruby 3, but by the story's end actually ended up by enjoying it. In Ruby 4, he becomes friends with Francois the Robot Waiter. His first non-android relationship takes place in Ruby 6, only to come to a tragic end. (Played by Bill Raymond)
Rodant Kapoor, in some series described as a Kapoorian; his physical description includes a pointed nose, beady little eyes, protruding front teeth and a tail; a running joke throughout the series is his constantly being called "Rodent" by everyone instead of "Rodant" and being referred to as "a sneaky little rat". He hired Ruby in the original series and has since been an often maligned companion of hers, and he spends a great deal of time trying to escape/hide from his mother. (Played by Tom Stewart, credited as "Art Fairbain" from Ruby 3 on)
Mustapha, Ruby's aircar; in appearance, he resembles a 1949 Mercury and speaks with an electronic Arabian accent. He is completely loyal to Ruby. (Played by Willy B)
Mother Kapoor, Rodant's mother, who tracks him down wherever he goes to escape her and drags him home (occasionally hiring Ruby to find him). (Played by Tom Stewart, credited as "Art Fairbain" from Ruby 3 on)
And/Or, a techie for the Digital Circus, a group of hackers who put on technological performances and revere Nikola Tesla. He creates many of the esoteric gadgets and devices Ruby uses in her cases and in Ruby 3 created a pair of sisters for himself, the And/Or Sisters, who for a time replaced the Android Sisters at the Digital Circus. (Played by Tom Stewart, credited as "Art Fairbain" from Ruby 3 on)
Onoffon and Offonoff, two "techno-witches", also from the Digital Circus. (Played by Honora Ferguson and Valeria Vasilevski)
The Tookah, a creature with four tentacles, three eyes, a thin blue mustache and a red fez. The original Tookah was blown up (inflated to a point where he exploded) in the original Ruby series. He often acts as an information source for Ruby's investigations, and he returns/survives by cloning himself; by the time of Ruby 7, he is in his 22nd incarnation. (Played by Fred Neuman)
Angel Lips, an android and former companion of Teru who has been programmed to be self-programming, thus giving her a will of her own. She made a short appearance and came to a final end in Ruby 3. A similar female android, "Angel Eyes", was offered to Teru as a payment/bribe in Ruby 5 but eventually left him too, returning in Ruby 6 only to be destroyed in an act of sabotage.
Molière, chief of the Mole People who dig the same archeological sites as Teru (only from underneath); he first appeared in the original Ruby series and returned in Ruby 7. His brother Molay appears in Ruby 3 and his cousin Mole-ecule appears in Ruby 5. (Played by Fred Neuman)
Francois, a robot and head waiter at the Cafe Garçon. (Played by Jim Cantell)
Toots Mutant, part human and part reptoid; originally Toots Malacca before she changed her name, an archaeologist and once the leader of the Zoot Mutants, a gang of techno-punks who are sometime allies of Ruby. (Played by Kara Duff McCormick in Ruby 1, Ruth Maleczech in Ruby 4)
The Android Sisters, who perform satirical speak-songs. Three albums of their speak-songs were released by ZBS Foundation and are currently available through ZBS and on Amazon.com: The Android Sisters' Greatest Hits, The Android Sisters – Pull No Punches and The Best of the Android Sisters. (Played by Ruth Breuer and Valaria Vasilevski)
The Slimies, bio-engineered assassins who are often after Ruby and the gang.  Slimies hunt by weaving "mind webs" to freeze and catch you in their thoughts.  They also explode when they're killed.
 Nikola Tesla, the famous electrical engineer and inventor, resurrected as an electronic ghost and revered by the Digital Circus as a "guardian spirit". (Played by Jim Cantell in Ruby 4)

References

External links
ZBS Foundation
Lodestone Catalog
Interview with Thomas Lopez
Audio Theater interview
Thrilling Detective writeup

American science fiction radio programs
Fictional private investigators
American radio dramas
1982 audio plays
ZBS Foundation
Cyberpunk media